Alonzo Monroe Clark (August 13, 1868 – October 12, 1952) was an American politician who was the 16th Governor of Wyoming from 1931 to 1933.

Biography
Clark was born in Flint, Indiana. He was raised and educated in Nebraska after his family moved there from Indiana. After graduating from Nebraska State Teachers College in 1898, he served as Superintendent of Schools for Dawes County, Nebraska, before moving to Wyoming in 1901.

In 1926, he was elected Secretary of State, and he was re-elected in 1930. When the then-current governor, Frank Emerson died, on February 18, 1931, just six weeks into his second term, Clark succeeded to the governorship. He took the oath of office after Emerson's Sunday funeral, which was three days later. That November, he was defeated in the Republican primary, and resumed his term as Secretary of State.  His loss in the primary remains the closest primary defeat for an incumbent Republican governor in United States history.

In 1934 he successfully secured the Republican nomination, but lost in the general election to the then-incumbent, Democrat Leslie A. Miller. He also campaigned unsuccessfully for seats in the U.S. House of Representatives and U.S. Senate.

The National Governors Association noted: 

He was married twice, first to Lucy M. Smith (who died in 1944) with whom he had one child, and then to Florence Russell.

He died on October 12, 1952, in Thermopolis, Wyoming, aged 84, and is buried in Carleton, Nebraska.

References

External links
 State of Wyoming's biography of Clark

1868 births
1952 deaths
Secretaries of State of Wyoming
Republican Party governors of Wyoming
People from Steuben County, Indiana
People from Campbell County, Wyoming